Allt na Lairige Dam (Burn of the Pass), is a pre-stressed concrete dam in Argyll and Bute, Scotland at . It creates an impounding reservoir which serves the Glen Fyne hydroelectric scheme.

The dam was designed by William George Nicholson Geddes, as directed by James Arthur Banks of Babtie, Shaw and Morton of Glasgow. Construction was carried out by Marples Ridgway. It was completed in 1956 and has a height of 22 metres.

See also
List of reservoirs and dams in the United Kingdom

References

Sources
"Argyll and Bute Council Reservoirs Act 1975 Public Register"

Dams in Scotland